Guido Bontempi (born 12 January 1960 in Gussago) is an Italian former road bicycle racer. Bontempi's career highlights include winning the spring's classic Gent–Wevelgem two times (1984 and 1986) and a total of 16 stages in the Giro d'Italia throughout his career. He also won six stages in the Tour de France and four stages in the Vuelta a España. In the 1988 Tour de France he won the prologue, allowing him to wear the yellow jersey in the first stage. He also won the points classification in the 1986 Giro d'Italia and wore the pink jersey as leader of the general classification for one stage in the 1981 Giro d'Italia. He also competed in the 1000m time trial and team pursuit events at the 1980 Summer Olympics.

Major results

1981
 Vuelta a España
1st Stages 1 & 3
 1st Stage 1a Giro d'Italia
1982
 1st Giro del Friuli
 1st Stage 14 Giro d'Italia
1983
 1st Giro del Piemonte
 Giro d'Italia
1st Stages 2 & 8
 Tour of the Basque Country
1st Stages 1 & 5
 1st Stage 1 Tirreno–Adriatico
1984
 1st Gent–Wevelgem
 1st Stage 21 Giro d'Italia
 1st Prologue Tirreno–Adriatico
1985
 1st Stage 2 Giro del Trentino
 1st Stage 5 Danmark Rundt
1986
 1st Gent–Wevelgem
 1st Giro della Provincia di Reggio Calabria
 1st Paris–Brussels
 1st Tre Valli Varesine
 Giro d'Italia
1st  Points classification
1st Stages 7, 10, 11, 17 & 20
 Tour de France
1st Stages 6, 22 & 23
1987
 1st Coppa Bernocchi
 1st Giro del Friuli
 1st Stage 12 Giro d'Italia
1988
 1st E3 Prijs Vlaanderen
 1st Coppa Bernocchi
 1st Giro del Friuli
 Giro d'Italia
1st Stages 2 & 5
 1st Prrologue Tour de France
1990
 Vuelta a Valencia
1st Stages 1a & 2
 1st Stage 19 Tour de France
 1st Stage 1b Setmana Catalana de Ciclisme
1991
 1st Tre Valli Varesine
 Vuelta a España
1st Stages 10 & 15
 1st Stage 2 Tour de Luxembourg
1992
 Giro d'Italia
1st Stages 7 & 9
 1st Stage 5 Tour de France
1993
 1st Stage 6 Giro d'Italia
 1st Stage 1 Giro del Trentino
 1st Stage 3 Vuelta a Valencia

References

External links

Palmarès by velopalmares.free.fr/ 
Palmarès by cyclingbase.com 
Palmarès by france-cyclisme.com 

1960 births
Italian male cyclists
Italian track cyclists
Living people
Italian Giro d'Italia stage winners
Italian Tour de France stage winners
Italian Vuelta a España stage winners
Cyclists at the 1980 Summer Olympics
Olympic cyclists of Italy
Tour de France prologue winners
Tour de France Champs Elysées stage winners
Cyclists from the Province of Brescia